Horní Řasnice is a municipality and village in Liberec District in the Liberec Region of the Czech Republic. It has about 200 inhabitants.

Administrative parts

The village of Srbská is an administrative part of Horní Řasnice.

Geography
It lies in the Frýdlant Hills. The village of Horní Řasnice is situated in the valley of the Řasnice Stream, which springs in the territory.

History
The first written mention of Horní Řasnice is from 1381.

Transport
There is a road border crossing with Poland Srbská / Miłoszów.

Sights
The landmark of Horní Řasnice is the Church of the Immaculate Conception. It is a Gothic church from the second half of the 13th century with Baroque modifications.

References

External links

Villages in Liberec District